"Heading Out to the Highway" is a song by English heavy metal band Judas Priest from their 1981 album Point of Entry. It was released as a single later that year, and was the band's first single to reach the US Mainstream Rock chart, peaking at No. 10.

Inspiration
On the lyrics, singer Rob Halford said,

Background

Although being featured for VH-1's Top 40 Driving Songs, a live version was included on The Best of Judas Priest: Living After Midnight, which was not endorsed by the band. Other live versions appear on the live albums Priest...Live!, Live in London, the DVD Live at US Festival and the second disc of the 30th Anniversary Edition of the album Turbo. The song was covered by American alternative metal band Stone Sour on their covers EP Meanwhile in Burbank..., and White Wizzard on the limited edition of Over the Top.

It is playable on the music video game Rock Revolution.

Reception
In the United States, the song peaked at number 10 on the Billboard Top Tracks chart.

PopMatters said, "More cynical minds would call this "Living After Midnight Part Two", but it’s actually the superior song, rigidity replaced by a much more relaxed groove, its ebullience a clear reflection of the band’s Ibiza surroundings, where the album was written and recorded. Perfectly suited for summertime listening, it’s nothing but fresh air and optimism, driven by a great opening riff."

Personnel

Judas Priest 
Rob Halford – vocals
K. K. Downing – guitar
Glenn Tipton – guitar
Ian Hill - bass guitar
Dave Holland – drums

Charts

References

1981 singles
Judas Priest songs
Songs written by Rob Halford
Songs written by Glenn Tipton
Songs written by K. K. Downing
Music videos directed by Julien Temple
1981 songs
Columbia Records singles